The Tanzania Hockey Association, also known as Twende Hockey Foundation, is the governing body of field hockey in Tanzania. It is affiliated to IHF International Hockey Federation and AHF African Hockey Federation.

History

Tanzania men's hockey played in the 1980 Summer Olympics at Moscow. They played five round-robin matches and lost all of them.

Since 2012 the Nation has really embraced the sport, This mostly being because of highly motivated and determined band of coaches and staff Alongside the Driving force of Tanzanian Hockey the Italian Valentina Quaranta.

In 2015, Tanzania sent the men's and women's hockey teams for All African Olympic Qualifiers for 2016 Rio.

See also
African Hockey Federation

References

External links
Official Website
Tanzania-FIH
Tanzania Hockey-FB

Tanzania
Hockey
Field hockey in Tanzania